África Ruiz Prats, known as África Pratt (born 18 September 1946) is a former Spanish actress and vedette.

She was born in 1946 in Larache. After her father's death, who was a soldier, she moved with her mother to Iberian Peninsula, where she studied in Alfaro. She then stayed seven years in Madrid studying ballet, so she debuted as a vedette at Celia Gámez company.

She first appeared in magazines, such as Lui. In 1960s she appeared on stage in Colomba and Su Excelencia la Embajadora. With Alfredo Alaria she appeared in Japón, mon amour, and finally she was hired by Zorí and Santos. From 1973 she starred in Tío ¿de verdad que vienen de París? along Alfredo Landa, Cuentos de las sábanas blancas, Los bingueros, Un lujo a su alcance along Concha Velascom Arturo Fernández and Nadiuska, La llamaban La Madrina, ¡Qué gozada de divorcio! along Andrés Pajares, Quiero un hijo tuyo, El cura ya tiene hijo and Al este del oeste, along Fernando Esteso, most of them directed by Mariano Ozores.

Filmography

References

External links
 

1948 births
Spanish film actresses
Spanish television actresses
Spanish stage actresses
Spanish vedettes
Living people
20th-century Spanish actresses